Aqsa School is an Islamic day school in Bridgeview, Illinois, in the Chicago metropolitan area.  the principal is Tammie Ismail.

The school has elementary, junior high, and high school levels. The elementary is coeducational while the later stages are all-girls'.

Aqsa School is not affiliated with the nearby Universal School.

History
The middle and high school opened in 1986 and the elementary division opened after its standalone school building opened in 1996.

In 2016 Sudanese American teacher Laila El-Amin, who headed the Arabic and religion departments of Aqsa School, received the Golden Apple award.

Demographics
Most students are of Arab heritage, and those of Palestinian heritage are the largest Arab subgroup. 

Other Arab-American groups include Egyptian, Jordanian, Lebanese, Libyan, and Syrian backgrounds. There are also students of European origin, including those of Albanian, Italian, and Turkish backgrounds. The school has South Asian-origin students; including those of Bangladeshi, Indian, Kashmiri, and Pakistani origins; and Southeast Asian-origin students, including those from the Philippines. In addition there are African-American and Hispanic and Latino students.

In terms of race most students are designated as White American, as Arab Americans are racially classified as "White".

Operations
The 6th and 9th grades see influxes of students who transfer from other schools.

References

External links
 

Girls' schools in Illinois
Islamic schools in Illinois
Private elementary schools in Illinois
Private middle schools in Illinois
Private high schools in Illinois
Private K-12 schools in the United States
1986 establishments in Illinois
Educational institutions established in 1986